Chethan Naik is an Indian playback singer born and brought up in Shivamogga.

Awards
Best Male Playback Singer-2017" award by KIMA (Kannada International Music Awards)

References

Living people
Kannada playback singers
Film musicians from Karnataka
Indian male playback singers
People from Shimoga
1989 births